Tabla (one of two Papuan languages also known as Tanah Merah) is spoken on the coast of Tanahmerah Bay, close to Jayapura, in northern Papua (Indonesia). It is spoken in Bukia, Depapre, and Wari towns, and 13 villages on north coast. Dialects are Yokari, Tepera, and Yewena-Yongsu.

Phonology

References

Languages of western New Guinea

Sentani languages